Utpal Borah is a Bharatiya Janata Party politician from Assam. He has been elected in Assam Legislative Assembly election in 2016 from Gohpur constituency.

He is also selected as the BJP candidate for Assam Legislative Assembly election 2021 from Gohpur Constituency.

References 

Living people
Bharatiya Janata Party politicians from Assam
Assam MLAs 2016–2021
People from Sonitpur district
1966 births
Assam MLAs 2021–2026